is a Japanese voice actor who was born in Nagano Prefecture and is affiliated with 81 Produce. He usually does supporting characters such as Basil Hawkins from One Piece

Filmography

Television animation
 Guin Saga (2009) - (Goranth)
 Kuromukuro (xxxx) - (Zeth)
 Naruto Shippuden (xxxx) - (Bunpaku, Roshi, Sanbi)
 One Piece (xxxx) - (Basil Hawkins, Mohji)
 The Unlimited: Hyōbu Kyōsuke (xxxx) - (Norman Green)

Films
 One Piece: Stampede (2019) - (Basil Hawkins)

Video games
 God of War (xxxx) - (Hades)
 One Piece: Pirate Warriors series (xxxx) - (Basil Hawkins)
 Solatorobo (xxxx) - (Bruno Dondurma)
 Soul Calibur 3 (xxxx) - (Olcadan)

Dubbing

Live-action
 Chocolat  (2000) – Serge Muscat (Peter Stormare)
 Jurassic Park 3 (2001) – Cooper (John Diehl)
 Before Night Falls (2001) – Cuco Sanchez (Sean Penn)
 Criminal (2004) – Richard Gaddis (John C. Reilly)
 Evolution (2005) – Officer Sam Johnson (Pat Kilbane)
 Exit Speed (2009) – Coach Jerry Yarbro (Gregory Jbara)
 Indiana Jones and the Temple of Doom (2009) – Lao Che (Roy Chiao)
 Oz the Great and Powerful (2013) – Skeptic (Ted Raimi)
 Percy Jackson: Sea of Monsters (2013) – Hermes (Nathan Fillon)
 West Side Story (2014) – Glad Hand (John Astin)
 The Assignment (2018) – Dr. Ralph Galen (Tony Shalhoub)

Animation
 Cars 2 – Francesco Bernoulli
 Dragon Booster – Connor Penn
 Gargoyles – Hudson
 The New Adventures of Peter Pan – Captain Hook

References

External links
 Official profile
 

1960 births
Living people
Japanese male voice actors
Male voice actors from Nagano Prefecture
81 Produce voice actors